Ivo Giovanelli (22 May 1919 – 29 July 2009) was a Croatian water polo player. He competed in the men's tournament at the 1948 Summer Olympics.

References

1919 births
2009 deaths
Croatian male water polo players
Olympic water polo players of Yugoslavia
Water polo players at the 1948 Summer Olympics
Water polo players from Split, Croatia
Burials at Lovrinac Cemetery